A shutter ridge is a ridge which has moved along a fault line, blocking or diverting drainage.  Typically, a shutter ridge creates a valley corresponding to the alignment of the fault that produces it.  Shutter ridges occur exclusively at strike-slip faults.

Example Locations

 Oakland, California
 Dragon's Back, Carrizo Plain, CA

References

Geomorphology
Physical geography
Structural geology
Landforms
Seismology